Joon-Olof Karlsson (born 20 September 1957) is a Swedish basketball player. He competed in the men's tournament at the 1980 Summer Olympics.

References

External links
 

1957 births
Living people
Swedish men's basketball players
Södertälje Kings players
Jämtland Basket players
Olympic basketball players of Sweden
Basketball players at the 1980 Summer Olympics
People from Nyköping Municipality
Sportspeople from Södermanland County